Tilson Oswaldo Minda (born July 26, 1983) is an Ecuadorian footballer who last played for Barcelona SC in the Ecuadorian Serie A.

Club career
Oswaldo first started out at Sociedad Deportiva Aucas. He remained at the club for five years before joining Deportivo Cuenca. He was part of Deportivo Cuenca's campaign for the Copa Libertadores 2006. His impressive performances attracted the likes of Club Sport Emelec.

After Deportivo Cuenca, Oswaldo became the new high-profile signing for Emelec. He was part of Emelec's squad which participated in the 2007 Copa Libertadores. He did not get a starting position because of the many talented players on Emelec.  As a result, he was sold to Deportivo Quito.

In Deportivo Quito, Oswaldo had a great first season. He played in the Copa Sudamericana 2008 where his team eventually fell to San Luis F.C. While with Quito he had a guaranteed starting position playing in central midfield. Minda formed a great partnership with Edwin Tenorio to help Deportivo Quito win the Ecuadorian Serie A 2008. Minda also helped Deportivo Quito win the Ecuadorian Serie A in December 2011. Days later he signed with Chivas USA of Major League Soccer.

On February 27, 2015, it was confirmed that Minda would be joining Barcelona SC for 2 years.

International career
Minda made his international debut for Ecuador in 2008 and was most recently called up to represent Ecuador in the 2014 FIFA World Cup

Honors
Deportivo Quito
Serie A: 2008, 2009, 2011

References

External links

1983 births
Living people
Footballers from Quito
Association football midfielders
Ecuadorian footballers
Ecuador international footballers
S.D. Aucas footballers
C.D. Cuenca footballers
C.S. Emelec footballers
S.D. Quito footballers
Chivas USA players
Barcelona S.C. footballers
2011 Copa América players
2014 FIFA World Cup players
Ecuadorian Serie A players
Major League Soccer players
Designated Players (MLS)
Ecuadorian expatriate footballers
Expatriate soccer players in the United States
Ecuadorian expatriate sportspeople in the United States